Onaje is the debut album by American pianist Onaje Allan Gumbs, released on the Danish-based SteepleChase label in 1977.

Critical reception

The Allmusic review by Ken Dryden states, "Gumbs displays surprisingly maturity for a composer only in his mid-20s at the time of the recording, performing a series of thought-provoking originals ... When Gumbs is playing works by others, he does not take the predictable path ... In the decades which have followed this debut, Onaje Allan Gumbs may not have earned the accolades which he has merited, but this CD is well-worth acquiring".

Track listing
All compositions by Onaje Allan Gumbs unless noted.
 "Waiting... in Love" – 4:29
 "Street Life" – 9:53    
 "Timeless" – 3:18
 "It Sho' Do Feel Good, Did Ya Here Me?" – 4:30
 "Giant Steps" (John Coltrane) – 3:06
 "Eye of a Shadow" – 6:44
 "Mousetrap" – 2:50
 "Con Alma" (Dizzy Gillespie) – 5:24
 "A Penny for Your Thoughts" – 3:42

Personnel
 Onaje Allan Gumbs – piano

References

1977 debut albums
Onaje Allan Gumbs albums
Solo piano jazz albums
SteepleChase Records albums